Philotheca acrolopha is a species of flowering plant in the family Rutaceae and is only known from a small area in Queensland. It is a shrub with crowded, wedge-shaped leaves and cream-coloured to pale pink flowers.

Description
There are ten stamens that are fused at the base, and to the petals. Flowering has been observed in July.

Taxonomy and naming
Philotheca acrolopha was first formally described in 1998 by Paul Wilson in the journal Nuytsia. The type specimen was collected on Mount Tozer in the Iron Range National Park.

Distribution and habitat
This philotheca grows in heath on a granite hill and is only known from the type location.

Conservation status
This species is classified as "vulnerable" under the Queensland Government Nature Conservation Act 1992. It was previously listed as "vulnerable" under the Australian Government Environment Protection and Biodiversity Conservation Act 1999 but was removed from that list in December 2010.

References

acrolopha
Flora of Queensland
Sapindales of Australia
Plants described in 1970
Taxa named by Paul G. Wilson